Karl Schaefer is an American television producer and writer.

He is best known for co-creating the 1990s series Eerie, Indiana with José Rivera. Prior to working on Eerie, Indiana. Schaefer created the series TV 101. His other television credits include Strange Luck, Monk, Small Shots, The Dead Zone, Eureka, Ghost Whisperer and the television film The Apartment Complex (1999), directed by Tobe Hooper. He was Executive Producer and Showrunner for Z Nation, a zombie series he co-created with Craig Engler, and its prequel spin-off, Black Summer.

Schaefer is the CEO of Unreality Inc, an Intellectual Property Creator.

Filmography

Television
The numbers in directing and writing credits refer to the number of episodes.

References

External links

American television producers
American television writers
American male television writers
Living people
Place of birth missing (living people)
Year of birth missing (living people)